Robert Frater (21 July 1885 – 6 January 1965) was a British fencer. He competed in the individual and team épée competitions at the 1924 Summer Olympics.

References

External links
 

1885 births
1965 deaths
British male fencers
Olympic fencers of Great Britain
Fencers at the 1924 Summer Olympics